Gimlie is a studio album by Neo-Medieval group Corvus Corax.

Track listing

All songs by Castus Karsten Liehm and Norbert Norri Drescher except 'Twilight of the Thunder God' by Amon Amarth.

 "Die Seherin (Intro)" - 1:40
 "Gimlie" - 4:05
 "Unicornis" - 4:01
 "Der Schrei" - 3:52
 "Koniginnen werden ihr neiden" - 3:39
 "Derdriu" - 4:32
 "Grendel" - 4:18
 "Beowulf is min nama" - 4:29
 "Sigeleasne sang" - 5:28
 "Intro Crenaid brain" - 1:08
 "Crenaid brain" - 5:07
 "Twilight of the Thunder God" - 4:10
 "Krummavisur" - 4:45
 "Twilight of the Thunder God (Hymnus) - 3.47

Credits 
 Wim Dobbrisch - bagpipes, shawm, bucina, vocals
 Castus Karsten Liehm - bagpipes, shawn, bucina, sistrum, vocals
 Hatz - big frame drum, cymbals, cassa, vocals
 Norri Drescher - big frame drum, bass drum, string drum, tam tam, vocals
 PanPeter - bagpipes
 Vit Polak - bagpipes, vocals
 Steve the Machine - percussion

References

External links 
 Corvus Corax official website
 Corvus Corax at Reverbnation
 Gimlie at Discogs

2013 albums
Corvus Corax (band) albums
Medieval music albums